HMS Kashmir, has been the name of a number of ships of the Royal Navy, from Kashmir a former part of the British Empire:

 — a troopship, formerly a P & O liner.
 — a K-class destroyer launched in 1939 and sunk in 1941.

Royal Navy ship names